Alizée Brien (born September 27, 1993) is a Canadian professional racing cyclist. She rides for Team TIBCO-SVB.

See also
 List of 2015 UCI Women's Teams and riders

References

External links

1993 births
Living people
Canadian female cyclists
Place of birth missing (living people)
20th-century Canadian women
21st-century Canadian women